A dining club (UK) or eating club (US) is a social group, usually requiring membership (which may, or may not be available only to certain people), which meets for dinners and discussion on a regular basis. They may also often have guest speakers.

United Kingdom
A dining club differs from a gentlemen's club in that it does not have permanent premises, often changing the location of its meetings and dinners.

Clubs may limit their membership to those who meet highly specific membership requirements. For example the Coningsby Club requires members to have been a part of either OUCA or CUCA, the Conservative Associations at the Universities of Oxford and Cambridge respectively. Others may require applicants to pass an interview, or simply pay a membership fee.

Early dining clubs include The Pitt Club, The Bullingdon Club, and The 16' Club.

United States
In the United States, similar social clubs are called eating clubs.  Eating clubs date to the late 19th and early 20th centuries and are intended to allow college students to enjoy meals and pleasant discourse.  Some clubs are referred to as bicker clubs because of the process of bickering over which applicants to accept as members. Replaced largely by the modern fraternity and sorority system, eating clubs are now limited to a few colleges and universities, most prominently at Princeton University, though other universities including Stanford University, Davidson College, Mount Olive College, and Reed College have the presence of eating clubs.

Dining clubs often have reciprocity with other dining clubs across the nation or even worldwide. Some are able to arrange reciprocity with other private social clubs with more facilities besides dining such as overnight guest rooms and a gym. Examples of such social clubs include Penn Club of New York City, which has reciprocity with India House Club at 1 Hanover Square.

List of dining clubs
This list is incomplete.
Date of founding in brackets

18th-century, or earlier, foundations
Hibernian Catch Club (c. 1680)
Kit-Cat Club (before 1705)
Beefsteak Club (c. 1705)
October Club (1711–1714)
Society of Knights of the Round Table (1720)
Society of Dilettanti (1732)
Divan Club (1744–1746)
Friendly Brothers of St Patrick (before 1750)
The Kensington Club (c. 1750-60)
The Club (1764)
Lunar Society (1775–1813)
Bullingdon Club (1780)
Beaver Club (1785–1830s)

19th-century foundations
Nobody's Friends (1800)
Canada Club (1810)
Trinity College Dublin Dining Club, London (c. 1810)
Grillions (1812)
Société des douze (1823)
Geological Society Dining Club (1824)
Raleigh Club (1827)
Pitt Club (1835)
X-club (1864–1893)
Myrmidon Club (1865)
The Whitefriars Club (1868)
The 16' Club (c. 1875)
Ivy Club (1879)
United and Cecil Club (as the Constituency Union in 1881)
Cottage Club (1886)
Cap and Gown Club (1890)
Tiger Inn (1890)
Colonial Club (1891)
Omar Khayyám Club (1892)
Castaways' Club (1895)
Ye Cherubs (Queens', Cambridge) (1895)
The Chinese Club (1897)
Stock Exchange Luncheon Club (1898–2006)

20th- and 21st-century foundations
Nova Scotia Club (1900)
Princeton Charter Club (1901)
Quadrangle Club (1901)
Coefficients (1902)
Princeton Tower Club (1902)
Terrace Club (1904)
Square Club (1908)
Chatham Dining Club (1910)
The Other Club (1911)
Cercle de l'Union interalliée (1917)
Coningsby Club (1921)
Ratio Club (1949–1958)
Piers Gaveston Society (1977)
Strafford Club (1995)

Fictional
 The Thursday Club, a monthly dining club, features in the novel The Three Hostages by John Buchan.
 The Twelve True Fishermen is the name of a fictional club in the eponymous short story by G. K. Chesterton in which his detective Father Brown solves the riddle of the disappearance of the club's silver.
 The annual dinner of The Ten for Aristology is the scene of a murder in the 1960 Nero Wolfe story Poison à la Carte,

See also
Eating clubs at Princeton University
Final clubs at Harvard
Gentlemen's club
Stanford Eating Clubs
Supper club
Syracuse Eating Club

References

External links
Discussion on "What are eating clubs"
Article from The Princeton Companion on formation of Princeton's eating clubs
Historical article on Princeton's eating clubs

 
Lists of organizations